Private Eye is a 2009 South Korean period film noir directed by Park Dae-min.

Plot 
Seoul, 1910. Hong Jin-ho, Joseon’s first detective, travels around solving trivial family disputes for pocket money as a private detective. However, he is determined to go to America someday and is saving up for the trip. Then one night, Gwang-soo, a medical physician in training, discovers a corpse in the woods and secretly takes it to practice dissecting. But the corpse turns out to be the son of Seoul’s most powerful man. While planning to flee in the middle of the night and afraid of murder accusations, Gwang-soo meets Jin-ho, and asks him to find the killer. When another corpse turns up in the woods, murdered in the same way as the first victim, Jin-ho and Gwang-soo use a piece of cloth they find in the victim’s mouth as the lead they need to bring them one step closer to the real killer.

Cast 
 Hwang Jung-min as Hong Jin-ho (private detective)
 Ryu Deok-hwan as Jang Gwang-soo (medical student)
 Uhm Ji-won as Soon-deok (inventor)
 Oh Dal-su as Oh Young-dal (police officer)
 Yoon Je-moon as Eok-kwan (circus master)
 Go Jun as Herb doctor
 Yoo Seung-mok

Box office 
According to its distributor CJ Entertainment, Private Eye attracted more than 554,000 viewers nationwide in the four days since its premiere on April 2, 2009, making it #1 at the South Korean box office. As of May 10, 2009, the total tickets sold domestically was 1,907,094.

References

External links 
  
 Private Eye at Naver 
 
 
 

2009 films
2000s crime films
South Korean crime films
South Korean mystery films
South Korean serial killer films
South Korean detective films
Films about drugs
Circus films
Films set in the 1900s
Films set in the Joseon dynasty
Films set in Seoul
2000s Korean-language films
CJ Entertainment films
Films set in Korea under Japanese rule
2000s South Korean films